Big Spring McMahon–Wrinkle Airport  is a municipal airport two miles southwest  of Big Spring, in Howard County, Texas. The FAA's National Plan of Integrated Airport Systems for 2009–2013 categorized it as a general aviation airport.

Most U.S. airports use the same three-letter location identifier for the FAA and IATA, but this airport is BPG to the FAA and HCA to the IATA (which assigned BPG to Barra do Garças Airport in Barra do Garças, Mato Grosso, Brazil).

History

World War II
Big Spring Army Air Field opened on 28 April 1942 as part of the United States Army Air Forces Central Flying Training Command; it was to train aviation cadets in high altitude precision bombing. The airfield received its first class of cadets in September 1942. The AT-11 (Beechcraft Model 18) and the B-18 Bolo were the primary aircraft flown for training. The 79th Bombardier Training Group continued operations until the surrender of Japan, when the cadets who agreed to remain in postwar service were transferred to Midland AAF, Texas. The last class graduated on 26 September 1945. The base was declared surplus and reverted to city control in November 1945, and it was Big Spring Municipal Airport for six years.

Webb Air Force Base
As a result of the need for trained pilots for the Korean War, the airfield reopened on October 1, 1951. The base was renamed Webb Air Force Base in 1952 for Lieutenant James L. Webb, a Big Spring native and World War II combat pilot, who was killed off the Japanese coast in 1949.

The 3560th Pilot Training Wing (later redesignated the 78th Flying Training Wing) was stationed at the base, and instruction of the first class began in April 1952. The base population soon passed the 2,000 mark. By the end of 1968 almost 9,000 pilots had been trained at Webb.

In 1956 the 331st Fighter Interceptor Squadron was transferred to Webb from Stewart Air Force Base in New York to defend the southern United States border on air intercept missions. In March 1967 the 331st was redesignated the 4760th Combat Crew Training Squadron and charged with training Royal Jordanian Air Force students. It was inactivated when the Jordanians were recalled because of the war with Israel in the summer of 1967.

Webb was also the site of annual summer training for college Air Force Reserve Officers Training Corps (AFROTC) cadets throughout the 1950s and most of the 1960s. In 1977 the end of the Vietnam War meant a decrease in the need for Air Force pilots. Webb was formally deactivated, and the property it had occupied was turned over to the Big Spring Industrial Park.

Historical airline service
American Airlines, first operating as Southern Air Transport, began the first commercial air service to Big Spring in 1929 when the airport was called American Airlines Field through the 1930's. Big Spring was an important fuel stop between El Paso and Dallas for American's transcontinental flights between Los Angeles and New York. American first used early tri-motor aircraft followed by Douglas DC-3's before service ended in 1950.

Continental Airlines began flights in 1944 serving Big Spring as one of many stops on a route between Denver, Albuquerque, and San Antonio. Continental also flew DC-3's but ended service in 1951.

Pioneer Air Lines began service in 1947 using the Municipal Airport (now McMahon-Wrinkle) as one of several stops on flights between Midland/Odessa and Dallas. The airline used Douglas DC-3 aircraft. Pioneer merged into Continental Airlines in 1955 marking a return for Continental. Continental moved its flights to the new Howard County Airport (HCA) northeast of Big Spring in 1960–61.

Trans-Texas Airways replaced Continental at HCA in 1963 using DC-3's and soon upgraded to Convair 240's and Convair 600 turboprops. Trans-Texas changed to Texas International Airlines in 1969 and ended service to Big Spring in 1974. Howard County Airport closed by 1985 at which time all local aviation moved back to McMahon-Wrinkle Airport.

Facilities

The airport lacks an active control tower; air traffic coordination is limited to UNICOM advisories only. The former Webb AFB control tower still stands, but it has not been operational since the Air Force's departure in late 1977 and the airfield's conversion to a civil airport.

In the year ending January 30, 2009, the airport had 12,195 aircraft operations, average 33 per day: 91% general aviation and 9% military. 48 aircraft were then based at this airport: 73% single-engine, 13% multi-engine, 6% jet, 6% ultralight and 2% helicopter.

Other tenants
Three units of the Big Spring Correctional Center (a federal prison privately operated by Cornell Companies) are located on the base grounds (as well as FCI Big Spring, a separate facility operated directly by the Bureau of Prisons).

See also
 Texas World War II Army Airfields

References

AFHRA

External links
 Former Webb AFB and Hangar 25 Air Museum website (Includes expanded history of the AFB)
 

Airports in Texas
Buildings and structures in Howard County, Texas
Transportation in Howard County, Texas